Jean Bouillet (14 May 1690, Servian near Béziers – 13 August 1777, Béziers) was an 18th-century French physician. The physician and encyclopédiste Jean-Henri-Nicolas Bouillet was his son.

1690 births
1777 deaths
18th-century French physicians
Contributors to the Encyclopédie (1751–1772)